Entre Mariposas (Among Butterflies) is the third solo album by Mexican singer Yuridia. 
The album was highly publicized for being the singer's first work to contain new material, penned by Reyli, Ilan Chester, Mario Domm and herself.

Chart performance
Released in late 2007, the album quickly shot up the charts and peaked at number 1, her third album to do so, despite competition from Shakira and RBD. Entre Mariposas was the best selling album at the Mexican music store Mixup for five consecutive weeks.

The album's first single, Ahora Entendí (written by both Yuridia and Camila frontman Mario Domm), was the fastest rising single of the year, debuting in the lower half of the Mexican Top 100 and reaching the top 40 in three weeks. The single is also Yuridia's first to feature an official music video. Weeks later, "Ahora Entendi" reached the #1 Peak.

The second single, Yo Por Él, peaked at #1 on the Mexican charts.

In the Latin US market, Yuridia debuted at number 13, her highest charting album. Entre Mariposas also charted in the top ten of the Heatseekers chart.

The third single, En Su Lugar, was the principal theme of the soap opera "Secretos del alma" of TV Azteca.

Singles

1. Ahora Entendí

2. Yo Por Él

3. En Su Lugar

Track listing

Certifications

References

2007 albums
Yuridia albums